This is the discography for American jazz musician Joe Henderson.

Year indicates (latest) recording date; releases were usually in the same year or at least the following, otherwise noted. Albums without available recording dates are placed at the end of presumed year of recording.

As leader

As sideman

References 

Discographies of American artists
Jazz discographies